The men's 90 kg powerlifting event at the 2012 Summer Paralympics was contested on 4 September at ExCeL London.

Records 
Prior to the competition, the existing world and Paralympic records were as follows.

Results

References 

 

Men's 090 kg